Kourtney Gibson (July 5, 1981) is an American business executive and the president of Loop Capital, a privately held investment banking firm. Gibson is also on the board of directors for Lululemon Athletica and MarketAxess, and the University of Miami board of trustees.

Early life and education 
Gibson was born at St. Luke's Memorial Hospital in Racine, Wisconsin on July 5, 1981. She attended J.I. Case High School in Racine, where she was an honors student and captain of the cheerleading squad. She turned down a full ride at University of Wisconsin and other universities to attend University of Miami.

She received an MBA from the Kellogg School of Management at Northwestern University and a BBA from the University of Miami. Gibson originally intended to study to become a bilingual pediatrician, but decided to pursue business while studying at the University of Miami.

Career 
Gibson began interning at Loop Capital in 1997, the year the company was founded. Gibson subsequently held various executive roles at the company, including heading its global equity division. In 2015, Crain's Chicago Business included Gibson on its 40 Under 40 list.

In 2016, she was elected president of Loop Capital, succeeding company co-founder Albert R. Grace, Jr.

In November 2020, Lululemon added Gibson to the company's board of directors. That same year, Gibson joined the board of directors for financial services company MarketAxess.

In 2021, she partnered with Google and Goldman Sachs to promote racial equity. The partnership between Loop Capital and Google was part of Goldman Sach's "One Million Black Women" initiative, which aims to reduce the racial wealth gap.

She is frequently featured as an expert on finance and cryptocurrency in publications such as Crain's Chicago Business and Markets Insider. Gibson is a regular contributor to CNBC. She spoke at the 2021 Women in Leadership Symposium at University of Wisconsin–Madison.

Other work 
Gibson is also a member of The Economic Club of Chicago, and the Treasury Market Practices Group sponsored by the Federal Reserve Bank of New York. She sits on the board of trustees at the University of Miami, and serves on the university's executive committee and Investment Committee, and serves on the Finance Committee of Viterbo University.

Philanthropy 
In 2017, Gibson made an endowment to Viterbo University for the foundation of the Nola Starling Recital Hall, named after Gibson's mother, an alumna of Viterbo University.

In 2013, she established Kourtney K. Ratliff Endowed Scholarship Fund at the University of Miami. The fund sponsors the Kourtney K. Ratliff Scholarship for Academic Excellence, which is awarded to African-American students from the Midwest who major in business.

Gibson is the chairman of the board of the Chicago Scholars Foundation and a board member of the Dibia Dream Foundation.

Personal life 
Gibson is married and has four children. In an interview with UCAN Chicago, she said that her primary motivation "faith and family", saying "I feel like I need to be successful in order to make sure that I can make my family successful and generations to come."

Gibson currently resides with her family in Atlanta, Georgia and Chicago, Illinois. She is an avid runner.

References 

21st-century American businesswomen
21st-century American businesspeople
African-American women in business
African-American bankers
1981 births
Living people